Luteone may refer to:

 Luteone (isoflavone), a prenylated isoflavone found in the pods of Laburnum anagyroides.
 Luteone (terpenoid), a twenty-three carbon terpenoid from the dorid nudibranch Cadlina luteomarginata.